Jaume Serra Serra (born 11 June 1959) is an Andorran politician. He is a member of the Liberal Party of Andorra.
From 1987 to 2011 he held among others positions, President of Forces Elèctriques d'Andorra that  runs Escaldes Hydroelectric Power Station.
He was Member of the Institute of National Board of Finance;
He was Chief executive officer of ENGAS. (Enagas SA is a Spain-based company active in the energy sector. The Company is engaged in the transport and underground storage of natural gas.)
He was President of Quars Andorra.
From 1993 to 1994 he was  Coordinator of the Strategic Plan of the Government of Andorra
In 1994 he was Minister of Economy
From 2004 to 2005 he was Coordinator of the Strategic Plan of the University of Andorra.
From 2005 to 2009 he was Member of the General Council (Andorra) and President of the Commission on Finance, Vice-President of the Commission for Foreign Affairs of the General Council and Vice-President of the Liberal Parliamentary Group.
From 2008 to 2009 he was Member of the Andorran Delegation to the Organization for Security and Co-operation in Europe.
From 2009 to 2011 he was Member the General Council (Andorra) and member of the Finance Committee and the delegation to the Inter-Parliamentary Union.
Since  he is ambassador of the Principality of Andorra to the Holy See.
Since  he is ambassador in Lisbon.

References

External links
Page at the General Council of the Principality of Andorra
Jaume Serra és nomenat nou ambaixador a la República Portuguesa 

1959 births
Living people
Government ministers of Andorra
Members of the General Council (Andorra)
Liberal Party of Andorra politicians
Ambassadors of Andorra to the Holy See
Ambassadors of Andorra to Portugal